Gustavo Campanharo (born 4 April 1992) is a Brazilian professional footballer who plays as a midfielder for Turkish club Kayserispor.

Career

Early career
Campanharo started his youth career in Juventude. In 2011, he moved on loan to Fiorentina academy. In 2013, he moved to another Brazilian team, Bragantino.

Hellas Verona
In September 2014 Gustavo joined Serie A team Verona on a loan deal until the end of the season. He made his debut for the team on 15 September 2014 in a match against Città di Palermo.

Evian

On 21 July 2015 Campanharo joined Ligue 2 team Evian on a season long deal. He made his debut for the team on 14 August 2015 in a match against Ajaccio. A month later, on 25 September 2015 he scored his first goal for the team in a match against Bourg en Bresse.

Ludogorets Razgrad
On 14 June 2016 Campanharo joined Bulgarian First League club Ludogorets Razgrad. On 2 February 2019, after 3 years in Ludogorets, his contract was ended by due mutual agreement as his contract was ending in the summer of 2019. He left emotional post in social media about the great time he had in Ludogorets and that he would stay a fan of the team whenever he goes.

Career statistics

Club

Honours
Ludogorets Razgrad
Bulgarian First League: 2016–17, 2017–18
Bulgarian Supercup: 2018

References

External links

1992 births
Living people
People from Caxias do Sul
Brazilian footballers
Brazilian expatriate footballers
Association football midfielders
Campeonato Brasileiro Série A players
Campeonato Brasileiro Série B players
Campeonato Brasileiro Série C players
Campeonato Brasileiro Série D players
Serie A players
Ligue 2 players
First Professional Football League (Bulgaria) players
Süper Lig players
Esporte Clube Juventude players
ACF Fiorentina players
Clube Atlético Bragantino players
Hellas Verona F.C. players
Thonon Evian Grand Genève F.C. players
PFC Ludogorets Razgrad players
Kayserispor footballers
Associação Chapecoense de Futebol players
Brazilian expatriate sportspeople in Italy
Brazilian expatriate sportspeople in France
Brazilian expatriate sportspeople in Bulgaria
Brazilian expatriate sportspeople in Turkey
Expatriate footballers in Italy
Expatriate footballers in France
Expatriate footballers in Bulgaria
Expatriate footballers in Turkey
Sportspeople from Rio Grande do Sul